Notification may refer to:
Notification (Holy See), an announcement by a department of the Roman Curia
Casualty notification, the process of notifying relatives of people who have been killed or seriously injured
Death notification, the process of notifying relatives of a military person who has died
Partner notification, the practice of notifying the sexual partners of a person who has been newly diagnosed with a sexually transmitted disease
Notification, a process of allowing legislation or orders already passed to come into effect, e.g. Australian Capital Territory Legislative Assembly
Notification system, in information technology, a combination of software and hardware that provides a means of delivering a message to a set of recipients
Pop-up notification

See also
Emergency Action Notification, the national activation of the Emergency Alert System
Notification Center, a message service in iOS
Notification RD 42 LRD 87 Part III, a 1997 ruling which resulted in the creation of seven new districts in the Indian state of Karnataka
Notification service, a system for sending a message to many people at once
Tender notification, an e-mail displaying tendering opportunities
Victim Notification System, a system updating crime victims regarding the location of the criminals